California Dreaming is a British reality television series, broadcast on Channel 4's T4 Saturday morning  programming block, that followed six British celebrities seeking success in Hollywood. They lived in a Hollywood mansion and were trained by doing challenges set by 'Acting Guro' Bernard Hillier. The programme's title came from the song "California Dreamin'" by The Mamas & the Papas.

Contestants 
The celebrities that took part in the series were:
Jodi Albert (actress)
Anouska de Georgiou (actress)
Ewen Macintosh (played Keith in The Office)
Ashley Mulheron (television presenter)
Giles Vickers-Jones (model and presenter)

External links 
California Dreaming at Channel4.com

Channel 4 original programming
2005 British television series debuts
2005 British television series endings
2000s British reality television series
English-language television shows
Television shows set in Los Angeles